Microtis eremicola, commonly known as the desert mignonette orchid or dryland onion orchid, is a species of orchid endemic to the south-west of Western Australia. It has a single hollow, onion-like leaf and up to fifty small, dull green to greenish-yellow flowers. This onion orchid is common in soil pockets on granite outcrops in inland areas, mostly between Hyden and Balladonia.

Description
Flowering occurs from September to November.

Taxonomy and naming
The desert mignonette orchid was first formally described in 1990 by Robert Bates who gave it the name Microtis media subsp. eremicola and published the description in Journal of the Adelaide Botanic Gardens. In 2004, David Jones and Mark Clements changed the name to Microtis eremicola. The specific epithet (eremicola) is Latin for "dweller of dry places", referring to the arid habitat of this species.

Distribution and habitat
Microtis eremicola is one of the most common Microtis orchids and grows in arid areas on granite outcrops, on the edges of salt lakes and along drainage lines between Geraldton and Israelite Bay but is most common between Hyden and Balladonia.

Conservation
Microtis eremicola is classified as "not threatened" by the Government of Western Australia Department of Parks and Wildlife.

References

External links
 

eremicola
Endemic orchids of Australia
Orchids of Western Australia
Plants described in 1990